The Women's points race at the European Track Championships was first competed in 2011 in the Netherlands.

The Points race lasts for a distance of  – 100 laps – with sprints every 10 rounds to gain extra points, a lap ahead of the other riders results in 20 points. In the 2014 edition, held on an outsized (333 metre) concrete outdoor velodrome, the race lasted 24 kilometres in 72 laps, with sprints every sixth lap.

Medalists

References

2011 Results
2012 Results

 
Women's points race
Women's points race